(born 15 December 1955) is a Japanese modern pentathlete. He competed at the 1984 Summer Olympics.

References

1955 births
Living people
Japanese male modern pentathletes
Olympic modern pentathletes of Japan
Modern pentathletes at the 1984 Summer Olympics